West Downs School, Romsey Road, Winchester, Hampshire, was an English independent preparatory school, which was established in 1897 and closed in 1988.

History

Founding
The school was founded by Lionel Helbert (1870–1919), with help from his sister Adeline Rose, wife to Vice Admiral Sir James Goodrich, KCVO (1851–1925). Helbert an exhibitioner of both Winchester and Oriel College, Oxford, was for over four years a House of Commons clerk.
The Helberts were supported by Hampshire's Lord Northbrook (who had also helped found the predecessor school), and by their kinsman Lord Rothschild.

Helbert, who described himself as Principal, was influenced by the Miss Mason system, as seen at her House of Education, Ambleside (akin to the PNEU), and things like the Montessori method, the ideas of Edmond Holmes, and the Little Commonwealth for young delinquents developed by Homer Lane on the lines of the George Junior Republic in America, basically as put by Norman Mac Munn, who taught at West Downs 1914–18, they were interested in the: emancipation of the child.

Architecture
Its buildings had been purpose-built for Winchester Modern School to designs by the architect Thomas Stopher on a good site on the south-western edge of the cathedral city of Winchester, nearly opposite (the Royal Hampshire County Hospital, architect William Butterfield) west of a Victorian county gaol, HMP Winchester (category B), and next to Edwin Hillier's nursery, established there in 1874.

Administration
On Helbert's death there was an hiatus under Dorset landowner William Brymer, and Lady Goodrich then passed the school to Kenneth Tindall, a Sherborne housemaster.

During the Second World War the school was evacuated first to Glenapp Castle and then more significantly to Blair Castle. At the end of the war it returned to Winchester.

In 1953 the school was bought by Jerry Cornes, who was headmaster until 1988.

Move to co-education
For most of its history West Downs was a boarding school for boys aged between eight and thirteen, but in 1970 it admitted its first girl, and from 1975 to 1988 it was co-educational (though curiously the school's founding intake in 1897 of four comprised two girls). [correction: by Geoffrey Bass, grandson of Kenneth Tindall:- KBT's granddaughter Diana Bass also attended the school in 1949 when it was still an all male establishment].

Closing and repurposing
West Downs was a rigorous and enlightened place which prepared its pupils admirably for a variety of schools (including Winchester and Eton) and also for life in general. It lasted ninety-one years and about three headmasters, closing in 1988.

The school's site has lived on as The West Downs Conference and Performing Arts Centre, which was opened by Lord Puttnam in May 2001, and then from 2005 as part of the University of Winchester; and from 2009 as the university's own Winchester Business School.

Helbert family
Lionel Helbert Helbert was sixth or seventh child of Captain Frederic John Helbert Helbert (1829–), 5th Madras Light Cavalry and military correspondent to the Times during the 1877 Turco-Russian war, the fifth son of John Helbert Israel (by Adelaide (Adeline) Cohen), second son of Israel Israel. In 1848 the grandfather John Helbert (1785–1861), with his nephew John Wagg (1793–1878), had formed broking firm Helbert, Wagg & Co. (bought by Schroders 1962). They were the Rothschild's principal broker.
Meanwhile, Helbert's mother was Sarah Magdalene 'Lena' (1837–1874) daughter of Richard Lane (1794–1870) (Plymouth Brother and descendant of Jane Lane) by Sarah Pink Tracey (of Liskeard). One of Helbert's Lane uncles was a Major-general in the Bengal Army and another, a shipping agent with Lane, Hickey & Company (bust by 1865), was English Secretary to the Japanese Legation in London and a Knight Commander of the Orders of the Rising Sun of Japan, Christ of Portugal, and Isabella the Catholic of Spain.

His aunt Adeline (1825–1892) was wife to Baron de Weissweiller of Madrid. Another was married to a Duke de Laurito (d.1907). His Cohen great-aunts, who were also his cousins, had married Nathan Mayer Rothschild and Moses Montefiore. A great-uncle Samuel Helbert Israel Ellis was a surgeon at the London Hospital c.1802 and treasurer of the Great Synagogue, Duke's Place, London. Samuel's son was Sir Barrow Helbert Ellis, K.C.S.I., HEICS (1823–1887).
Meanwhile, Helbert's brother Charles Helbert Helbert (d.1903) married Evelyn Mary Kennedy, granddaughter of Earl of Cassillis and Viscount Dungarvan and great-granddaughter of Earl of Howth.

(source: Records of the Franklin Family and Collaterals, compiled by Arthur Ellis Franklin, private circulation, George Routledge & sons, London, 1915.)

Some alumni

About 2,100 pupils passed through West Downs, including the following:

Helbert era (1897–1922)
Sir Robert Abercromby, 9th Bt.
Derek Allhusen
John Amery, activist and member of the British Free Corps; executed 19 December 1945, aged 33
 Randal McDonnell, 8th Earl of Antrim, and his brother James, MBE
Lord Ashley, father of Earl of Shaftesbury
David Astor, CH (proprietor and editor of The Observer)
William Astor, 3rd Viscount Astor (peer)
3rd Earl of Balfour
Simon, Denzil, Giles (cricketer), Aubrey, and Esmond Baring, grandsons of 4th Lord Ashburton
Sir Malcolm Barclay-Harvey (governor of South Australia)
Sir Randle Baker-Wilbraham, 7th Bt
Colonel H. C. C. Batten, DSO (despatches five times)
8th Earl Beauchamp (politician) and his brother Hugh Patrick Lygon (one of the inspirations for Evelyn Waugh's Sebastian Flyte)
Sir Alexander Maitland Sharp Bethune, 10th and last Baronet
Lt. Colonel Patrick J. S. Boyle, grandson of 7th Earl of Glasgow, killed Anzio 1944
Sir Frederick "Boy" Browning (lieutenant-general and husband of Daphne du Maurier)
Gerard Bucknall (lieutenant-general)
William Simon Campion, of Danny, Sussex
7th and 8th Earls of Chichester
Hon. Sir Gerald Chichester, KCVO, and his brother Richard (killed 1915, Serbia), sons of 3rd Lord Templemore
Richard Hugh Cholmondeley, editor The Heber Letters, 1783–1832, London, 1950
Peter Colefax, son of Sibyl and Arthur Colefax
Lt. General Sir George Collingwood, KBE, CB, DSO; and his brother Sir Edward Foyle Collingwood FRS, DL, CBE
Lt. Commander Trevenen Penrose Coode, of 818 Naval Air Squadron, helped sink the Bismarck
Major Henry Augustus (recte Dom. Joseph) Coombe Tennant, son of Winifred Coombe Tennant by the Earl of Balfour (as alleged by Archie Roy);
Lt. Col. Sir John Crompton-Inglefield, of Parwich, high sheriff, 1938, son of an admiral, and grandson of Edward Augustus Inglefield
Sir Michael Culme-Seymour 5th Bt.
Major-General Sir David Dawnay, KCVO; and his brother Vice-Admiral Sir Peter Dawnay, KCVO; (grandsons of 8th Viscount Downe and 5th Marquess of Waterford).
Lt. Col. Christopher Dawnay, MVO (of Lazard Bros., Dalgety, and Guardian Assurance);
Air Commodore Desmond H. de Burgh, AFC (killed 1943), 1st cousin twice removed of Chris de Burgh (their ancestors came from Oldtown, County Kildare);
M. A. Denton-Thompson, consul-general, São Paulo, 1944–1945
3rd Lord De Ramsey
Michael d'Oyly Carte (killed in a car accident, Switzerland 1932); son of Rupert D'Oyly Carte
Vice Admiral Sir Edmund Malcolm Evans-Lombe, KCB, commanded , 1942–1943
4th Lord Farrer
12th Earl Ferrers, and his brother hon. Andrew Shirley, keeper of Fine Art (Ashmolean), biographer of Constable, and author The Lion and the Lily, 1956
Sir Francis Festing (Field Marshal)
Sir Fordham Flower, brewer and "extraordinary maverick chairman of Stratford" (as described by Sir Peter Hall)
Sir Edward Ford (courtier)
Richard Fort, MP
Ivor Geikie-Cobb (MD, MRCS, LRCP, FRSL, physician and author)
2nd Lord Glenconner (father of Emma Tennant), and his brothers Lt. the Hon. Edward "Bim" Tennant (killed in action, World War I war poet), see monumental inscription to him in Salisbury Cathedral designed by Allan G. Wyon, and Stephen Tennant, nephews of Margot Asquith
Anthony Henniker-Gotley (1887–1972), a rugby union international who represented England from 1910 to 1911 and captained the national side
2nd and last Viscount Harcourt
2nd Lord Hazlerigg (cricketer)
Michael Hesketh-Prichard, son of Hesketh Hesketh-Prichard, and grandson of 3rd Earl of Verulam (thus 1st cousin of 5th and 6th earls, see below)
Admiral Sir Deric Holland-Martin, husband to Dame Rosamund, and his brother Christopher Holland-Martin
6th Viscount Hood
2nd and last Lord Horder. Mervyn Horder
7th Lord Hotham
Lord Hyde, killed shooting 1935, son of George Villiers, 6th Earl of Clarendon
Sir Richard Keane, 6th Bt., of Cappoquin, born in 1909
7th Lord Kensington and his brothers Hugh (father of 8th Lord K.), David and Michael Edwardes (adjutant of the Tower Hamlet Rifles c1942);
3rd Lord Kinross
Antony Bulwer-Lytton, Viscount Knebworth (politician)
Lt. Col. Harold Boscawen Leveson-Gower, 1st cousin of Lord Sherfield, and descended from youngest son of 1st Earl Gower who married daughter of Edward Boscawen
Robert Linzee, CB, son-in-law of 1st Viscount Craigavon
Malcolm, 1st Lord McCorquodale (politician)
Henry Wyndham Stanley Monck, 6th Viscount Monck
Victor Montagu (disclaimed the Earldom of Sandwich and politician) and his brother William Drogo Sturges Montagu, RAF flying officer (no. 91111), died on 26 January 1940
Henry James Montagu Stuart Wortley, of BOAC, nephew of 2nd Earl of Wharncliffe and grandson of 1st Lord St Oswald
Sir Oswald Mosley, 6th Bt, Ancoats; (Politician, MP for Harrow 1918–24, Smethwick 1926–31, Chancellor of the Dutch of Lancaster 1929–30, know principally as the founder of the British Union of Fascists)
(John Seely, 2nd Baron Mottistone) and 3rd Baron Mottistone
Major-General Sir John Nelson, KCVO, sometime Major-General commanding the Household Division
Edward Agar, 5th Earl of Normanton
Simon Nowell-Smith, sometime London Library librarian
3rd Lord Lord O'Neill (killed 1944), and his brother Hon. Brian, killed 1940
Sir Walter Frederic Pretyman, KBE, of Campos, Brazil, emigrated there 1924. Son of Ernest Pretyman.
Sir John Pigott-Brown, 2nd Bt. (killed in action, 1942)
 Sir Hugh (Hubert) Charles Rhys Rankin, 3rd Bt. (a soi-disant "red militant Communist")
John Rankin Rathbone (politician and RAFVF World War II fighter pilot, killed in action)
5th Lord Rayleigh and his brother Charles Strutt
Sir Richard Rees 2nd and last Bt.
Major Francis Howe Richards, DSO (despatches and wounded four times World War I)
7th Earl of Romney
Lord Duncan-Sandys, CH (politician)
 Christopher Soames, Baron Soames
Sir Peter Scott, CH, FRS (naturalist)
Sir David Scott Fox, KCMG, civil servant, briefly thought to KGB Agent Scott, Arthur Wynn
7th and last Earl of Sefton, and his brother Hon. Cecil Molyneux, RN (killed at Jutland)
Sir Roger Makins, Lord Sherfield, FRS (diplomat)
2nd Viscount Simon
Peter Smith-Dorrien, son of General Sir Horace Smith-Dorrien and killed by Zionists at the King David Hotel bombing 1946, and his brother Gerald (killed 1944) and their 1st cousins-once-removed Algernon R. A. (killed 1942) and Thomas Mervyn Smith-Dorrien-Smith of Tresco, Isles of Scilly, the mother of his children was Russo-Georgian H.S.H Princess Tamara Imeretinsky. (Tresco thanks to Augustus Smith); five Dorrien-Smiths were killed 1940–46.
Sir Rupert Speir (politician)
Ernest John Spooner (admiral)
8th Earl of Tankerville (then styled Viscount Ossulston)
7th Marquess of Waterford;
5th and 6th Earls of Verulam
Sanders Watney, of Watney Combe Reid, in 1934 he said: I am not convinced that there would be any demand in this country for beer in cans. I cannot conceive the idea of a can ever replacing the half pint, pint or quart bottle. The canning habit is certainly growing, but I do not think it will spread to drinks.
Col.  John Francis Williams Wynne, CBE, DSO, JP, of Peniarth, Tywyn
14th Earl of Winchilsea and his brother Denys Finch Hatton, depicted by Robert Redford in the film Out of Africa (1985)
Sir John Garmondsway Wrightson, 3rd Bt (of Head Wrightson) (and his Cornes era brothers Peter, OBE, Commander Rodney and Judge Oliver Wrightson).

Tindall era (1923–1953)
5th Lord Aldenham and his elder brother Vicary (d.1944)
3rd Viscount Allenby of Megiddo, (elected hereditary peer)
Rt. Rev. Keith Appleby Arnold, inaugural Bishop of Warwick
Lt. General Sir Norman Arthur, Hon. Colonel Scottish Yeomanry
Sir H. G. Beresford-Peirse, 6th Bt.
4th Lord Biddulph
Sir Jack Boles, MBE, director-general of National Trust
Hugh Brigstocke, freelance writer and art historian, and Admiral Sir John Brigstocke, KCB, CBE, judicial appointments and conduct ombudsman
John Browne-Swinburne, of Capheaton; former Lycetts chairman
Lt. Michael Vandeleur Christie-Miller, (killed 1944), (uncle-in-law of Sir Thomas Dunne, KG)
John Crichton-Stuart, 6th Marquess of Bute, KBE
Thomas Probyn Cokayne, killed 1943, and grandson of George E. Cokayne (G.E.C.)
4th Lord Cochrane of Cults
Sir John Colville (Churchill's secretary)
Michael Colvin (politician)
Peter Brownell Cornwallis, RAFVR, killed 1945 on SOE Operation Crupper 37, Norway, son of Sir Kinahan Cornwallis
Charles Cottrell-Dormer, of Rousham
Simon Courtauld
Jurat the Hon. John Coutanche, of Jersey, son of Lord Coutanche
4th and 5th Lords Crawshaw and their brother John Brooks
Captain Oliver Dawnay, CVO, (courtier and father of head of United Agents)
Lt. Col. Charles Dawnay, son of Admiral Sir Peter D., and grandson of 9th Duke of Queensbury
Richard Ulick Paget de Burgh, son of Air Commodore D.H. de Burgh, AFC
Jeremy Delmar-Morgan, racing-driver and owner Mini Marcos
Charles Drace-Francis, sometime UK High Commissioner to Papua New Guinea and described in Lord Ashcroft's Dirty politics Dirty times: My fight with Wapping and New Labour, MAA Publishing, 2005
Sir Claude du Cros, 3rd Bt., grandson of Sir Arthur du Cros
Anthony Duckworth-Chad
9th Viscount Falmouth (and 26th Baron le Despencer), and brothers Robert, MC, (politician), Evelyn (killed 1943), and Henry Boscawen (AMICE)
Robin, 13th Earl Ferrers (statesman)
Sir Philip Frankland-Payne-Gallwey, 6th and last Bt.
3rd Lord Gainford and his brother George Pease
Wilfrid Grenville-Grey, sometime of Farnham Castle, brother-in-law (from 1974) of Thabo Mbeki and (from 1951) of 10th Duke of Richmond. His wife (from 1963) Edith Dlamini was Drum Magazine cover-girl.
Mark Hitchens, schoolmaster and author: The Inimitable P.G.Wodehouse, (2009), Oscar Wilde's Last Chance: The Dreyfus Connection (1999), Prime Ministers' Wives – and One Husband (2004), Wives of the Kings of England (2006), and a book on West Downs itself
Daniel Hodson, Gresham Professor of Commerce 1999–2002; of LIFFE and DACS; son of Harry Hodson
7th Viscount Hood
Peter Howell, actor
Richard Ingrams (editor of Private Eye) and Leonard Ingrams;
Wayland Young, 2nd Lord Kennet (politician)
Aswin Kongsiri, Thailand-based director and chairman
H.E. Sawanit Kongsiri, Thai Deputy Foreign Minister, sometime Ambassador to Austria (and Hungary), IAEA, UNIDO, China, and Australia
Visnu Kongsiri, leading figure in Thai book world and major general in Royal Thai Armed Forces
Sir Julian Loyd, KCVO, H.M. the Queen's land agent at Sandringham 1964–91
Anthony McDermot (1942–2010), journalist
6th Lord Methuen, of Corsham
Richard Walter Meynell, FCA, grandson of Ernest George Pretyman
John Dru Montagu, (son of above William Drogo Montagu, and step-grandson of Lord Beaverbrook)
Sir Jeremy Morse (Chancellor of University of Bristol, Chairman of Lloyds Bank)
Lt.-Gen. Sir Anthony Mullens, KCB
Hon. James Ogilvy, third son of 12th Earl of Airlie
Terence O'Neill, Lord O'Neill of the Maine, (statesman, fourth Prime Minister of Northern Ireland, 1963–69), son of Arthur O'Neill and brother of Shane, 3rd Lord O'Neill (see above);
Angus Pelham Burn
Jeremy Hew Philipps, of Picton, chairman Laurence Philipps Holdings, father of Nicky Philipps, and grandson of 1st Lord Milford;
Nicholas Ridley, Baron Ridley of Liddesdale, Lord Ridley of Liddesdale, Conservative politician
William Walter Robert Graham Scarth, killed accidentally 14 August 1948, son of an "Heritable Bailie" of Breckness, Skaill House, Stromness, and Hall of Sand, Shetland
William Reresby Sitwell, of Barmoor Castle, FRGS, commanded HMS Flint Castle 1943–45, married Joan Castle, and his brother S. T. Sitwell, who married ex-wife of 2nd Lord Selsdon
Christopher, Lord Soames, CH (statesman)
Sir James Spooner, kt., chairman Coats Viyella, director Morgan Crucible, chairman Prince's Trust
Admiral Sir William Stavely (First Sea Lord)
Sir Michael Straker, chairman Northumbrian Water. A café in the Sage Gateshead is named after him.
Sir Charles Tidbury, chairman of Whitbread and IRA target
Major Rob Tillard, author: Ski Story, The Decline and Renaissance of The Ski Club of Great Britain, Rob Tillard Ski Guides, 2000
Sir Anthony Roger Duncan Twysden, 11th Bt.
2nd Viscount Ullswater (elected hereditary peer and courtier)
Major-General Charles Vyvyan, CB, CBE, Gentleman Usher of the Scarlet Rod
Dr. Giles Warrack, associate professor, Mathematics Department, North Carolina Agricultural and Technical State University
Frank Willan, Royal Air Force officer and politician
Peter Wilmot-Sitwell, inventor of the city "dawn-raid" and father of Alex Wilmot-Sitwell
2nd and last Lord Wilson
John K. Wingfield Digby, of Sherborne Castle and son of Simon Wingfield Digby
Harold Lindsay Cathcart Woolley, RAFV, killed 1942, son of Geoffrey Harold Woolley

Cornes era (1954–1987)
Richard Addis, journalist and former Anglican monk
6th Lord Aldenham
Khalid Alireza (at the school from 1960)
Major General Benjamin J. Bathurst CBE Late Welsh Guards, son of Admiral of the Fleet Sir David Bathurst;
Arthur, Nicholas, Charles and Vere Boscawen, sons of 9th Viscount Falmouth
Philip Colfox, grandson of Victor Crutchley, and son of Sir John Colfox, 2nd Bt., of Symondsbury, Dorset
Harry Cory Wright, photographer
Guy Dawnay, son of Lt. Col. Christopher Dawnay, MVO, and grandson of Sir Hereward Wake, 13th Bt.;
Charles Desmond Ashburner Stanhope de Burgh and his brother Simon Robert Fitzroy, sons of R.U.P. de Burgh, and third cousins of Chris de Burgh
Peter de Teissier, photographer
Finn, Kieran and Erskin Guinness, sons of 2nd Lord Moyne
Valentine Guinness, lead singer of Loyd Grossman's band and husband to Lulu Guinness, and his brother Jasper, sons of 3rd Lord Moyne
6th Earl Granville
Aurora Gunn, wife to Randal McDonnell, Viscount Dunluce, son of 9th Earl of Antrim
Tom Hammick, painter
Tony Hanania, Beirut-born novelist
Dorian Haskard, professor of cardiovascular medicine, National Heart and Lung Institute, Imperial College London, head of the Vascular Sciences Section, and director, Centre for Vascular Inflammation and Lead Clinician in Rheumatology, Hammersmith Hospital
Hon. Philippa Lennox-Boyd, wife to 4th Lord Spens
Tom Lubbock, art critic and illustrator
3rd Lord Margadale and his brother Hughie Morrison (racehorse trainer)
7th Viscount Monck
Peter Neyroud
Simon Ould, (celebrated Hackney artist within the Decima Gallery purlieu)
Hamish Robinson, poet (Poems about wine, 2009)
Andrew Selous, politician
Damian Crosley Talbot Sitwell, son of S. T. Sitwell
7th Earl of Verulam, financier
7th Lord Huntingfield

References

Nowell Smith (ed), Memorials of Lionel Helbert, Founder and Head of West Downs Winchester, London, Oxford University Press, Humphrey Milford, 1926.
Mark Hichens, West Downs – A Portrait of an English Prep School, Pentland Press, 1992.
Norman Mac Munn, (1877–1925), A Path to Freedom in the School, G. Bell & Sons, London 1914, & The Child's Path to Freedom, 1921.
The Times, 10 November 1919, obituary of Mr. Lionel H. Helbert.

External links
Old West Downs Society
Roll of Honour. A long list of those killed, 1914–18 & 1939–45.
A page about Kenneth Tindall.

Boarding schools in Hampshire
Schools in Winchester
Educational institutions established in 1897
Defunct schools in Hampshire
Educational institutions disestablished in 1988
1897 establishments in England
1988 disestablishments in England